Adam Walker is a Canadian politician who was elected to the Legislative Assembly of British Columbia in the 2020 British Columbia general election. He represents the electoral district of Parksville-Qualicum as a member of the British Columbia New Democratic Party.

Electoral record

References 

Living people
People from the Regional District of Nanaimo
21st-century Canadian politicians
British Columbia New Democratic Party MLAs
Year of birth missing (living people)